The following is a list of the European Film Award winners of various special awards:

Winners

External links
European Film Academy archive

European Film Academy Awards